This article concerns the period 699 BC – 690 BC.

Events and trends
 699 BC—Khallushu succeeds Shuttir-Nakhkhunte as king of the Elamite Empire.
 697 BC—Birth of Duke Wen of Jin in China.
 697 BC—Death of King Huan of Zhou in China.
 697 BC—Hezekiah succeeded by Manasseh as king of Judah.
 696 BC—King Zhuang of Zhou begins his reign in China.
 696 BC—The Cimmerians ravage Phrygia, possible migration of the Armenians.
 696 BC—Pantacles of Athens wins the stadion race at the 21st Olympic Games.
 692 BC—Karib'il Watar of Saba' is recorded as having given "gifts" (tribute) to King Sennacherib of Assyria.
 692 BC—Pantacles wins the stadion race for a second time and the diaulos at the 22nd Olympic Games.
 691 BC—King Sennacherib of Assyria defeats king Humban-nimena of Elam in the Battle of Halule.
 690 BC—Taharqa, a king of the Twenty-fifth Dynasty, ascends the throne of Egypt (approximate date)
 c. 690 BC—Death of Manava, author of the Indian geometric text of Sulba Sutras.
 690s BC—W'rn Hywt of D'mt in Ethiopia appears in the inscriptional record and mentions the king of Saba', Karib'il Watar.

Significant people

References